The Tokarevskoye gas condensate field, 80 km west of Oral, consists of four individual accumulations whose productivity is proved by several wells. Gas water surface of some deposits range between 2776–2082 m.

References

Energy in Kazakhstan